Don't Breathe is a 2014 Georgian-language French documentary film directed by Nino Kirtadze. It was screened in the Contemporary World Cinema section at the 2014 Toronto International Film Festival.

Cast
 Levan Murtazashvili
 Irma Inaridze

References

External links
 

2014 films
2014 documentary films
French documentary films
2010s Georgian-language films
Films set in Tbilisi
2010s French films